Beberbach is a river of North Rhine-Westphalia and Lower Saxony, Germany.

The Beberbach springs east of Extertal.

See also
List of rivers of Lower Saxony
List of rivers of North Rhine-Westphalia

References

Rivers of Lower Saxony
Rivers of North Rhine-Westphalia
Rivers of Germany